Jean Erdman, Baron Dieskau or Jean-Armand Dieskau, Baron de Dieskau or Ludwig August von Dieskau (1701 – 8 September 1767) was a German-born soldier remembered mostly as a French general and commander in America for a part of the French and Indian War.

Biography
He was aide-de-camp of Marshal Maurice de Saxe, and visited St. Petersburg in that officer's interest in 1741. He also served in the Netherlands, and in 1748 became major general of infantry and commander of Brest. He was sent to Canada on 20 February 1755, at the head of French troops, to conduct the campaign against the British.

His forces comprised 600 Canadians, as many Indians and 200 regular French troops. He ascended Lake Champlain to its head, designing to attack Fort Edward; but the guides took the road to Lake George by mistake . On 8 September, he was informed by scouts that a detachment of 1,000 men under Col. Ephraim Williams, of Massachusetts, had been sent against him, and, disposing his men in ambush in the form of a horseshoe, he surprised the enemy and put them to flight.

.

After pursuing their opponents to the British camp, the Indians halted, the Canadians became alarmed, and Dieskau, with his 200 regulars, was forced to sustain the fight. For five hours the New England militia "kept up the most violent fire that had yet been known in America." Almost all the French regulars perished  , and Dieskau himself was wounded three times; but he refused to retire, and seated himself on a stump, exposed to the bullets. Finally, seeing a soldier approaching as if to capture him, Dieskau put his hand into his pocket for his watch, which he intended to give to his captor; but the man, supposing that he was drawing a pistol, shot him, inflicting a wound that ultimately caused Dieskau's death over a decade later.

This event became known as the Battle of Lake George. Dieskau was kept a prisoner until 1763, when he was exchanged and returned to France, where he was given a pension. Command in Canada passed to Louis-Joseph de Montcalm.

Notes

References

External links 

1701 births
1767 deaths
Military personnel from Dresden
Erdman, Jean
French generals
People of the French and Indian War
People of New France
German emigrants to France